The 1993 Atlanta Braves season was the Braves' 123rd in existence and their 28th since moving to Atlanta. The Braves were looking to improve on their 98–64 record from 1992 and win the National League pennant for a third consecutive year, and finally win a World Series in the 1990s. 

The Braves finished the season with a 104–58 record to win the National League West for the third consecutive year after trailing the San Francisco Giants, who finished in second place by one game, for most of the season in what is generally regarded as the last real pennant race before playoff expansion. 1993 was also the last year that the team competed in the National League West, as they would shift to the National League East for 1994.

The 1993 Atlanta Braves are seen as one of the greatest Major League Baseball teams in history. Despite their excellent regular season, the Braves' streak of National League pennants ended at two as they fell to the underdog Philadelphia Phillies in six games in the National League Championship Series. By a twist of fate, the Braves beat the Pittsburgh Pirates, the Phillies in-state rivals, in back-to-back NLCS series in 1991 and 1992, but in 1993, lost to the Pirates in-state rivals.

Offseason
December 7, 1992: Billy Taylor was drafted by the Toronto Blue Jays from the Atlanta Braves in the 1992 rule 5 draft.
December 9, 1992: Greg Maddux was signed as a free agent with the Atlanta Braves.
December 21, 1992: Randy St. Claire was signed as a free agent with the Atlanta Braves.
December 21, 1992: Jerry Willard was signed as a free agent with the Atlanta Braves.

Regular season
At the end of August, the Atlanta Braves tried to acquire Dennis Martínez from the Montreal Expos. The Expos placed Martinez's name on the waiver wire and the Braves claimed him. The Expos were not about to let Martinez go to Atlanta for the waiver fee of $20,000. After claiming Martinez, the Expos contacted the Braves to see if they were interested in talking about a trade. Martinez had the final word on any movement because his seniority gives him veto rights over a trade.
On September 11, 1993, Chipper Jones made  his major league baseball debut. It was in a game against the San Diego Padres. Jones did not have any at-bats in the game.

Transactions
April 3, 1993: Billy Taylor was returned (earlier draft pick) by the Toronto Blue Jays to the Atlanta Braves.
April 13, 1993: Mark Davis was traded by the Atlanta Braves to the Philadelphia Phillies for Brad Hassinger (minors).
May 3, 1993: Randy St. Claire was released by the Atlanta Braves.
June 3, 1993: John Rocker was drafted by the Atlanta Braves in the 18th round of the 1993 amateur draft. Player signed August 23, 1993.
 July 18, 1993: Fred McGriff was traded by the San Diego Padres to the Atlanta Braves for Melvin Nieves, Donnie Elliott, and Vince Moore (minors).

Opening Day starters
Jeff Blauser
Sid Bream
Ron Gant
Tom Glavine
David Justice
Mark Lemke
Greg Olson
Terry Pendleton
Deion Sanders

Season standings

Record vs. opponents

Roster

Notable events

July 20, 1993:  At Atlanta–Fulton County Stadium, a fire broke out in the skybox/press box area, delaying the start of the scheduled game between the Braves and the St. Louis Cardinals. Incidentally, the Braves' trade for Fred McGriff was completed a few days earlier and McGriff arrived at the stadium that night. With the delayed start, McGriff was able to suit up and start the game at first base.  McGriff helped the Braves erase a 5–0 deficit by hitting a two-run homer in the sixth inning. The Braves went on to win the game 8–5.

Player stats

Batting

Starters by position
Note: Pos = Position; G = Games played; AB = At bats; H = Hits; Avg. = Batting average; HR = Home runs; RBI = Runs batted in

Other batters
Note: G = Games played; AB = At bats; H = Hits; Avg. = Batting average; HR = Home runs; RBI = Runs batted in

Starting pitchers
Note: G = Games pitched; IP = Innings pitched; W = Wins; L = Losses; ERA = Earned run average; SO = Strikeouts

Other pitchers
Note: G = Games played; IP = Innings pitched; W = Wins; L = Losses; ERA = Earned run average; SO = Strikeouts

Relief pitchers
Note: G = Games pitched; W = Wins; L = Losses; SV = Saves; ERA = Earned run average; SO = Strikeouts

National League Championship Series

Game 1
October 6: Veterans Stadium in Philadelphia

Game 2
October 7: Veterans Stadium in Philadelphia

Game 3
October 9: Atlanta–Fulton County Stadium in Atlanta

Game 4
October 10: Atlanta–Fulton County Stadium in Atlanta

Game 5
October 11: Atlanta–Fulton County Stadium in Atlanta

Game 6
October 13: Veterans Stadium in Philadelphia

Award winners
 David Justice, OF, Silver Slugger
 Greg Maddux, National League Cy Young Award
 Greg Maddux, Pitcher of the Month, August
 Greg Maddux, P, Gold Glove
 Greg Maddux, The Sporting News Pitcher of the Year Award
 Fred McGriff, 1B, Silver Slugger

1993 Major League Baseball All-Star Game

Farm system

References

 1993 Atlanta Braves at Baseball Reference
 Atlanta Braves on Baseball Almanac

Atlanta Braves seasons
Atlanta Braves Season, 1993
National League West champion seasons
Atlanta Braves